Lowell High School is a single-campus public high school located in downtown Lowell, Massachusetts, United States. The school is a part of Lowell Public Schools. The mascot is the Red Raider and the colors are maroon & gray. Current enrollment is over 3,000 students.

History

Lowell, Massachusetts was incorporated as a town in 1826 and Lowell High School opened shortly after in 1831.  One of its earliest homes was a small brick building on Middlesex Street owned by the Hamilton Manufacturing Company.  Lowell High School was the first and remains the oldest desegregated public high school in the United States; African American Caroline Van Vronker was a student at Lowell High School in 1843, at a time when every other public high school in the United States was segregated.

In 1840, the high school moved into a new building located between Kirk Street and Anne Street along the Merrimack Canal. Over the next 100 years, the school campus expanded.  The oldest extant building replaced the 1840s building in 1893. In 1922, a large new building was built along Kirk Street and in the 1980s another building was built on the opposite side of the Merrimack Canal with connecting walkways over the canal.  There are now three major buildings with one limited to the Freshman Academy.

Notable alumni
Charles Herbert Allen (1865) Politician: Congressman; Governor of Massachusetts
James Cook Ayer (1838) Manufacturer: Wealthiest patent medicine businessman of his day
George D. Behrakis (1951) Founder of Dooner Laboratories and later purchased Muro Pharmaceuticals, Inc.
Milton Bradley (1854) Manufacturer: Largest game manufacturer in the United States
Benjamin Franklin Butler (1830s) Politician: Congressman; Governor of Massachusetts
 George Whitefield Chadwick (1871) Musician: American composer.
Rosalind Elias (1947) Musician: Opera singer
Gustavus Fox (1830s) Politician: Assistant Secretary of the Navy during the Civil War
John Galvin Jr. (1983) Athlete: Professional Football
Frederic Thomas Greenhalge (1859) Politician: Congressman; Governor of Massachusetts
Lynn Gunn (2012) Musician: Frontwoman, band PVRIS
Mary Hallaren (1925) Director: Women's Army Corps]
Tom Hayes (1978) Businessman and Author
Helen Sawyer Hogg (1921) Astronomer
Deborah Hopkinson (1969) Author
Jujubee (drag queen) (2002) Drag queen, contestant on Rupaul's Drag Race
Jack Kerouac (1939) Author: On the Road; The Dharma Bums
Ted Leonsis (1973) Businessman: President AOL; Founder and CEO, Monumental Sports & Entertainment (owner of NHL's 2018 Stanley Cup Champion Washington Capitals, NBA's Washington Wizards, WNBA's 2019 Champion Washington Mystics, and 2020 & 2021 NBA 2K League Champion Wizards District Gaming); and Co-Founder, Revolution Growth Fund 
Alice Parker Lesser Lawyer, suffragist
Gerard Lew (1907) Founder: DuSable Museum of African American History See Lowell Black History:  University of Massachusetts Lowell, Center for Lowell History
Teresa Lew (1914) Teacher: See Lowell Black History:  University of Massachusetts Lowell, Center for Lowell History
Elinor Lipman (1968) Author: The Boston Globe
Ed McMahon (1940) Entertainer
Marty Meehan (1974) Politician: Democratic; Congressman, President of the University of Massachusetts system
F. Bradford Morse (1938) Politician: Republican; Congressman
William Henry O'Connell (1877) Cardinal: Archdiocese of Boston
Elizabeth Ordway (1846)Teacher: Early advocate for women's suffrage in Washington territory, was one of the first group of young women recruited to become teachers in pioneer Seattle in the 1860s. 
John Jacob Rogers (????) Politician: Republican; Congressman
Tom Sexton (1958) Author
Ezekiel A. Straw (1830s) Politician: Governor of New Hampshire
Billy Sullivan (American football) (1933) Businessman: Owner of an original franchise, the Boston Patriots, of the American Football League
Johnny Thomson (????) Race car driver: 1959 Indianapolis 500 pole sitter
Paul Tsongas (1958) Politician: Democratic; Congressman; Senator
Micky Ward (1991) Professional Boxer and Philanthropist
Edgar A. Wedgwood (1874) Politician: adjutant general of the Utah National Guard
Helen Augusta Whittier (1862) Businesswoman: President, Whittier Textile Company, Educator, Suffragist. See Lowell Stories: Women's History:  University of Massachusetts Lowell, Center for Lowell History
Esther Wilkins (????) Health Care: dental pioneer and author of Clinical Practice of the Dental Hygienist

References

External links 

Lowell High School Collection University of Massachusetts Lowell, Center for Lowell History

Merrimack Valley Conference
Schools in Lowell, Massachusetts
Public high schools in Massachusetts
1831 establishments in Massachusetts